In taxonomy, the Methanocaldococcaceae are a family of microbes within the order Methanococcales. It contains two genera, the type genus Methanocaldococcus and Methanotorris. These species are coccoid in form, neutrophilic to slightly acidophilic, and predominantly motile, and they have a very short generation period, from 25 to 45 minutes under optimal conditions. They produce energy exclusively through the reduction of carbon dioxide with hydrogen. Some species have been found in marine hydrothermal vents.

Phylogeny
The currently accepted taxonomy is based on the List of Prokaryotic names with Standing in Nomenclature (LPSN)  and National Center for Biotechnology Information (NCBI).

See also
 List of Archaea genera

References

Further reading

Scientific journals

Scientific books

Scientific databases

External links 

Archaea taxonomic families
Euryarchaeota